Gråkallen is a mountain in the Bymarka area in the municipality of Trondheim in Trøndelag county, Norway.

The summit is covered by an abandoned fenced military installation.  Below the summit (on the col to the right of the summit above the lake) there is a ski station accessible by bus from Trondheim. In the summer, the ski runs through the pine forests allow hiking and mountain biking back to the city below.

Name
The first element is grå which means "grey" and the last element is the finite form of kall which means "old man". (It is common in Norway to compare mountains with old men.)

References

Mountains of Trøndelag
Geography of Trondheim